Events from the year 2001 in Macau, China.

Incumbents
 Chief Executive - Edmund Ho
 President of the Legislative Assembly - Susana Chou

Events

September
 23 September - 2001 Macanese legislative election.

December
 19 December - The opening of Macau Tower in Sé.

References

 
Years of the 21st century in Macau
Macau
Macau
2000s in Macau